Lokua Kanza (born April 1958) is a singer-songwriter from the Democratic Republic of the Congo. He is known for his soulful, folksy sound.

Biography
Lokua Kanza was born Pascal Lokua Kanza in Bukavu in the province of Sud-Kivu, in the eastern part of the Democratic Republic of Congo. He is the eldest of eight children, with a Mongo father and a Tutsi mother from Rwanda. In 1964, the family went to live in Kinshasa in a middle class area, until the day when Pascal's father, a ship's captain, died. His mother then moved to a much poorer area of the city, and Pascal had to work to feed the family. As well as singing in churches. Lokua Kanza sings in French, Swahili, Lingala, Portuguese, and English. He was a coach in The Voice Afrique Francophone in 2016 and 2017.

Discography

 Lokua Kanza (1993, Universal)
 Wapi Yo (1995, BMG)
 3 (1998, Universal)
 Toyebi Te (2002, Universal)
 Toto Bona Lokua (2004, No Format!) with Richard Bona & Gerald Toto
 Plus Vivant (2005, Universal)
 Nkolo (2010)

See also
Music of the Democratic Republic of the Congo

References

External links

BBC World Music Review of Toyebi Te

1958 births
Living people
People from South Kivu
Wrasse Records artists
21st-century Democratic Republic of the Congo male singers
Democratic Republic of the Congo songwriters
Democratic Republic of the Congo people of Rwandan descent
Mongo people
Tutsi people
20th-century Democratic Republic of the Congo male singers
21st-century Democratic Republic of the Congo people